James Roger King (1927–1991) was an American ornithologist, specializing in avian physiology.

Biography
After graduating from Santa Clara High School, King served in the U.S. Army from 1945 to 1946. He then matriculated at San Jose State College, where he graduated in 1950 with a B.A. in biological and physical sciences. King became a graduate student at Washington State College, where he graduated in zoology with an M.A. in 1953 and a Ph.D. in 1957. His doctoral thesis, supervised by Donald S. Farner, dealt with "premigratory adiposity in the White-crowned Sparrow". From 1957 to 1960 King was an assistant professor in experimental biology at the University of Utah. In the zoology department Washington State University, he was from 1960 to 1962 an assistant professor, from 1962 to 1967 an associate professor, and from 1967 until his death a full professor. He was the chair of the department from 1972 to 1978.

King was the editor-in-chief of The Condor from 1965 to 1968 and, for the last 20 years of his life, was the co-editor, with Donald S. Farner, of the multi-volume series Avian Biology. Washington State University's Department of Zoology annually awards a James R. King Memorial Fellowship for graduate students.

He married Eleanor Porter (1928–2006) in 1950. Upon his death he was survived by his widow, a son, two daughters, and a granddaughter.

Awards and honors
 1969 — Guggenheim Fellowship
 1974 — Brewster Medal of the American Ornithologists' Union
 1977–1978 — President of the Council of the Cooper Ornithological Society
 1978 — Fellow of the American Association for the Advancement of Science
 1979 — Washington State University Distinguished Faculty Award
 1980–1982 — President of the American Ornithologists' Union

Selected publications
 
 
 
 
 
  1969
  1972

As editor

References

1927 births
1991 deaths
American ornithologists
San Jose State University alumni
Washington State University alumni
Washington State University faculty
Fellows of the American Association for the Advancement of Science